Cerithium protractum is a species of sea snail, a marine gastropod mollusk in the family Cerithiidae.

Description

Distribution
Cerithium protractum is native to Eastern Mediterranean Basin.

References

Cerithiidae
Gastropods described in 1838